07 may refer to:

 The year 2007, or any year ending with 07
 The month of July
 7 (number)
 FIFA 10
 Madden NFL 07
 Cricket 07
 The number of the French department Ardèche
 The musical duo Zero 7
 07 zgłoś się, a Polish criminal television series
 07 (album), a 2007 album by Nina Badrić
 07 (Dialing code), The dialing code used by Pagers And Mobile Phones

See also

O7 (disambiguation)
7 (disambiguation)
007 (disambiguation)